The 1,000 Catch Club is a group of 14 National Football League players with at least 1,000 career receptions. The list consists of 12 wide receivers and 2 tight ends.

Players with at least 1,000 receptions

Through the  season

Active players with at least 900 receptions
Through the  season; includes ranking.

Players with at least 80 postseason receptions

Through  playoffs.

See also
NFL records (individual)
List of National Football League career receiving yards leaders
 List of National Football League career receiving touchdowns leaders
 List of National Football League annual receptions leaders

References

receptions
Receiving yards leaders
National Football League lists